Moruzzo is a comune (municipality) in the Province of Udine in the Italian region Friuli-Venezia Giulia, located about  northwest of Trieste and about  northwest of Udine.

The municipality of Moruzzo contains the frazioni (subdivisions, mainly villages and hamlets) Alnicco, Brazzacco, Telezae, Modotto, and Santa Margherita del Gruagno.

Moruzzo borders the following municipalities: Colloredo di Monte Albano, Fagagna, Martignacco, Pagnacco.

It is also known as the "Beverly Hills" of Friuli Venezia Giulia.

Demographic evolution

References

External links
 www.comune.moruzzo.ud.it/
 www.borgomodotto.it/

Cities and towns in Friuli-Venezia Giulia